Krishnamachari Srikkanth  (born 21 December 1959), also known as Cheeka, is a former captain of the Indian cricket team and former chairman of the selection committee. He played a crucial part in India's team batting line up as opener especially on the 1983 Cricket World Cup winning squad by contributing crucial 38 runs as a top scorer in the finals against West Indies. 
Srikkanth was the First player in the World to have a Career with International Centuries, 5 Wicket Hauls, and also 5 Catches in an Innings. Known for his aggressive opening style, he has represented the Indian National Cricket team and Tamil Nadu in Indian domestic cricket. He is also a commentator on Star Sports Tamil.

Career
Srikkanth played domestic cricket, for Tamil Nadu and South Zone. He made his One Day International debut against England in Ahmedabad in 1981, followed two days later by his Test debut against England at Bombay at the age of 21. He opened the innings partnering Sunil Gavaskar. Known for his aggressive batting style, he was an early role model for opening batsmen in future years to adopt a similar approach. He was called by his fans as Viv Richards of India

As he matured, he tempered his aggression somewhat and became a mainstay of the Indian cricket team. He was an integral member of the Indian squad when they won the 1983 Prudential World Cup and 1985 Benson & Hedges World Championship of Cricket. In the 1983 World Cup final against the West Indies, Srikkanth top-scored in the finals.

He was made the captain of the Indian team in 1989.  In the same year, Sachin Tendulkar made his debut under Srikkanth's captaincy . He remained the captain of the team for India's tour of Pakistan in 1990 and managed to draw all the Tests of the series. But the selectors were disappointed with his batting failures and dropped him. He returned two years later and played for another year before being dropped again. He retired from international cricket in 1993. He was the first Indian player to score a half-century and pick up 5 wickets in an ODI. He achieved this feat against New Zealand at Visakhapatnam in 1988. Srikanth Ended his Test Career with 5 Catches in an Innings during his Last Test Match.

Srikkanth holds the unusual distinction of scoring the only run ever scored in international cricket at Ray Mitchell Oval, in Mackay, Australia. The venue hosted its only international match during the 1992 Cricket World Cup, and the match was washed out after two deliveries.
In June 2013, Srikkanth participated in the 6th season of Jhalak Dikhhla Jaa.

In February 2022, he participated in StarPlus's Smart Jodi as Contestant with his wife, Vidya.

Style
Srikkanth was an opening batsman noted for his aggressive attacking strokes in contrast to his first batting partner and senior Sunil Gavaskar. He is the pioneer in Pinch-hitting in ODIs at least a decade before Mark Greatbatch started in the 1992 World-Cup & Sachin Tendulkar, Sanath Jayasuriya much later. He was known to take risks even in the early part of the innings, often scoring boundaries over the inner ring of fielders. He shares three 100-run ODI partnerships with Ravi Shastri which included the first for India in ODI.

Post retirement
After retirement he had a stint as the coach of the India 'A' team. He has since been a broadcaster and commentator with various sports and news channels. On 18 February 2008, Krish Srikkanth was named the ambassador for the Chennai Super Kings franchise of Indian Premier League.

On 27 September 2008, he was appointed the Chief Selector of the Indian Cricket team. His tenure ended in 2012.

On 20 December 2012, Krish Srikkanth was named the ambassador for the Sunrisers Hyderabad franchise of Indian Premier League.

Also, he is a commentator for the TV Network Star Sports Tamil. Srikkanth is also included to the panel of All India Council of Sports (AICS) as a member in January 2020.

Personal life
Srikkanth is an electrical engineer who graduated from College of Engineering, Guindy in Chennai. Srikkanth is married to Vidya. Srikkanth has two sons, one of whom, Anirudha, plays for Tamil Nadu cricket team and has played for both Chennai Super Kings and Sunrisers Hyderabad in the Indian Premier League. Their eldest son is Aditya.

Television

In popular culture 
 Jiiva played Kris Srikanth in the Hindi, Tamil,Telugu multilingual film 83 (2021). His depicted Cheeka's style and sense of humour very brilliantly and audience praised him for the acting.

References

External links

India One Day International cricketers
India Test cricketers
India Test cricket captains
Tamil Nadu cricketers
South Zone cricketers
Cricketers at the 1983 Cricket World Cup
Cricketers at the 1987 Cricket World Cup
Cricketers at the 1992 Cricket World Cup
Tamil sportspeople
1959 births
Living people
College of Engineering, Guindy alumni
Indian Premier League
Cricketers from Chennai
India national cricket team selectors
Indian cricket commentators
Indian sports broadcasters
Cricketers who have acted in films
Indian cricket coaches
Indian Premier League coaches